Pilipinas MX3 Kings were a Filipino basketball team that played in the ASEAN Basketball League (ABL). The team only played one season in the ABL, mainly because of financial difficulties after Manny Pacquiao pulled out his financial support from the team, and internal disputes within the team.

History
The team was originally known as Mindanao Aguilas. After Manny Pacquiao became one of the team's owners, the name was changed to Pacquiao Powervit Pilipinas Aguilas.

In October 2015, the Pilipinas Legends Group became a co-owner of the team and took over the team's management. The following month, the team was acquired by SportsLegends Managers, Inc. and renamed Pilipinas MX3 Kings, through a sponsorship arrangement with DMI Medical Supply Co., Inc. (makers of MX3 Capsule and Tea).  The team was renamed after the withdrawal of Pacquiao as a co-owner of the team, thus making the Pilipinas Legends / SportsLegends Group of Dick Balajadia the new majority owner. Jean Michael Alabanza was appointed as the new team manager and Chito Loyzaga was appointed as team consultant. The team's home venue is the San Juan Gymnasium.

In December 2015, as part of the team overhaul, Sunday Salvacion, Jondan Salvador, Chad Alonzo, Emmerson Oreta, Adrian Celada and import Charles Mammie were released. Team manager Jean Michael Alabanza also announced that there will be a new World Import and a Filipino-American guard coming in. It was later announced that Jason Deutchman will be joining the team as one of its local players.

The team ended the 2015–16 ABL season in last place with a record of 2 wins and 18 losses, the worst record by a Filipino team in the league's history.

Home arenas
 USEP Gymnasium (2015 – played only one game there vs. Mono Vampire Basketball Club)
 San Juan Gym (2015–2016)
 Malolos Convention Center (2016)

Final roster

References

External links
 
 

ASEAN Basketball League teams
Basketball teams established in 2015
Defunct basketball teams in the Philippines
2015 establishments in the Philippines
Basketball teams disestablished in 2016
2016 disestablishments in the Philippines